Siniša Matić (born 13 March 1967) is a Serbian professional basketball coach.

Coaching career 
Matić coached  Zemun Lasta, Novi Sad, Vojvodina Srbijagas, Metalac Valjevo, and Karpoš Sokoli. In summer 2021, he joined his hometown team Borac Zemun. In March 2022, Vršac hired Matić as their new head coach.

References

External links
 BIBL Profile
 Eurobasket Profile
 Profile at mybasketballagent.com

1967 births
Living people
KK Crvena zvezda youth players
KK Metalac coaches
KK Vojvodina Srbijagas coaches
KK Novi Sad coaches
KK Vršac coaches
KK Zemun coaches
Serbian men's basketball coaches
Serbian expatriate basketball people in North Macedonia
People from Zemun